Empshott is a village in the East Hampshire district of Hampshire, England. It lies 3.5 miles (5.5 km) southwest of Bordon, its nearest town. It is included in the civil parish of Hawkley. The nearest railway station is 2.7 miles (4.4 km) southeast of the village, at Liss.

Geography
To the west the land rises steeply in a scarp formation known as the East Hampshire Hangars. Goleigh Hill (220 m) and Noar Hill (214 m) are two of the highest points in the county which forms parts of the Hampshire Downs. The River Rother has its source in the village.

History
Empshott is listed in the 1086 Domesday survey as being held by Geoffrey the Marshal, having been granted the land from pre-conquest landowners Bondi the Constable and Saxi of Clatford after 1066. The hamlet comprised four villagers and a mill.

The famous Hambledon batsman John Small was born in Empshott in 1737.

Church
The village is home to the Holy Rood church which dates to the 13th century. Later additions include a Victorian bell-turret.

References

External links

Villages in Hampshire